Tomasello Winery is a winery located in Hammonton in Atlantic County, New Jersey. Tomasello is the second-oldest active winery in the state, after Renault Winery. The vineyard was first planted in 1888, and opened to the public in 1933 after the end of Prohibition. Tomasello is one of the largest winegrowers in New Jersey, having 70 acres of grapes under cultivation, and producing 65,000 cases of wine per year. Although the winery is in Hammonton, most of the grapes are grown on three vineyards in the neighboring Winslow Township in Camden County. The winery is named after the family that owns it.

Wines
Tomasello Winery is in the Outer Coastal Plain AVA. Its wines are made from a variety of fruits including:

Grape wines

Baco noir
Cabernet Franc
Cabernet Sauvignon
Catawba
Chambourcin, Chardonnay
Colombard
Concord
De Chaunac
Landot noir
Merlot
Muscat blanc
Niagara
Noah
Petit Verdot
Pinot gris
Pinot noir
Riesling
Rkatsiteli
Sangiovese
Seyval blanc
Syrah
Vidal blanc
Villard blanc
Villard noir

Non-grape wines 

almond
apple
blackberry
blueberry
cherry
cranberry
pomegranate
raspberry 

Tomasello was a participant at the Judgment of Princeton, a wine tasting organized by the American Association of Wine Economists that compared New Jersey wines to premium French vintages.

Advocacy, licensing, associations, and outlets
Tomasello is an advocate of the direct shipping of wine from wineries to customers. Tomasello has a plenary winery license from the New Jersey Division of Alcoholic Beverage Control, which allows it to produce an unrestricted amount of wine, operate up to 15 off-premises sales rooms, and ship up to 12 cases per year to consumers in-state or out-of-state. The winery is a member of the Garden State Wine Growers Association and the Outer Coastal Plain Vineyard Association. Tomasello operates outlet stores in several New Jersey towns all of which are associated with local farms such as Chester, Freehold, Lambertville, Smithville, Cranford, and Wyckoff.

See also
Alcohol laws of New Jersey
American wine
List of wineries, breweries, and distilleries in New Jersey
New Jersey Farm Winery Act
New Jersey Wine Industry Advisory Council
New Jersey wine

Notes

References

External links
Garden State Wine Growers Association
Outer Coastal Plain Vineyard Association

Wineries in New Jersey
Tourist attractions in Atlantic County, New Jersey
1933 establishments in New Jersey
Hammonton, New Jersey
U.S. Route 30